Romanzoffia tracyi is a species of flowering plant in the borage family known by the common names Tracy's mistmaiden and Tracy's romanzoffia. It is native to the coastline of western North America from far northern California north to the southern tip of Vancouver Island, where it grows among rocks on oceanside bluffs.

It is a tufted plant reaching no more than about 12 centimeters tall, its herbage growing from a network of hairy brown tubers. The leaves have rounded blades notched into lobes along the edges, borne on petioles which may be several centimeters long. The inflorescence is short cyme of funnel-shaped flowers each just under a centimeter long. The flower has a yellow-throated white corolla set in a calyx of narrow, pointed sepals.

References

External links
Jepson Manual Treatment
USDA Plants Profile
Washington Burke Museum
Photo gallery

Hydrophylloideae
Flora of the West Coast of the United States
Flora of the Northwestern United States
Flora of British Columbia
Flora of California
Flora of Oregon
Flora of Washington (state)
Taxa named by Willis Linn Jepson
Flora without expected TNC conservation status